Satakunta University of Applied Sciences (SAMK) is a university of applied sciences in the Satakunta region of Finland. The university is headquartered in Pori and offers additional instruction in Huittinen, Kankaanpää and Rauma. The number of students is 6,000 and the staff about 400.

Faculties

The faculties implement education, R&D activities, and business operations.

Health and Welfare

Health and Welfare faculty offers bachelor's and master's degree level education in Social and Health Services and Fine Arts. The faculty was the first to begin offering the Human Ageing and Elderly Services degree and also offers the only English-language Physiotherapy degree in the Nordic countries. The faculty is responsible for developing the aging services specialization, has strong expertise in accessibility and runs the learning centre Soteekki.

Service Business

This faculty is in charge of e.g. Tourism and Business related degrees: Economy and Financing, Sales and Marketing, Entrepreneurship, Business Law, Public Administration, Management and Digital Expertise. Of the emerging fields highlighted in the SAMK strategy, Tourism Business belongs in this faculty. With regard to tourism, special focus is placed on nature tourism and the development of local tourism.

Logistics and Maritime Technology

The Logistics and Maritime Technology faculty focuses on international business, logistics and maritime management. Of the areas of strength listed in the SAMK strategy, this faculty is in charge of maritime management and the emerging field of multi-disciplinary logistics. The faculty participates in, for example, co-operative projects for the development of maritime education in Namibia.

Technology

The Technology faculty is in charge of a majority of the Engineering degrees that SAMK offers. Of the areas highlighted in the SAMK strategy, Automation, Robotics and Artificial Intelligence, and Smart Water and Environmental Technology are this faculty's specialties. Notable laboratories and learning environments include e.g. the telecommunications NGN lab, solar power lab and simulation environments. The water institute Wander is also a part of the faculty.

Degrees in English

Bachelor's Degrees 

•	Industrial Management, Bachelor of Engineering

•	Logistics, Bachelor of Engineering

•	Physiotherapy, Bachelor of Health Care

•	International Business, Bachelor of Business Administration

•	International Tourism Development, Bachelor of Hospitality Management

•	Nursing, Bachelor of Health Care

•	Sea Captain, Bachelor of Marine Technology

The duration of bachelor's degree Programmes is 210 or 240 ECTS credits, and their completion time usually takes from 3.5 to 4.5 years.

Master's Degrees 

•	Business Management and Entrepreneurship, Master of Business Administration

•	Maritime Management, Master of Marine Technology or Master of Engineering

•	Rehabilitation Master of Health Care or Master of Social Services

•	Welfare Technology, Master of Engineering or Master of Health Care

The scope of the studies is 60–90 credits. The degree can be completed while working in about 1.5–2.5 years.

References

External links
Satakunta University of Applied Sciences website
Organisation of Satakunta University of Applied Sciences
Satakunta University of Applied Sciences in Youtube
Theses and publications

Education in Satakunta
Universities and colleges in Finland
1997 establishments in Finland